Mill Street is a short street at the western end of the central business district (CBD) of Perth, Western Australia. It runs between St Georges Terrace and Mounts Bay Road.

History
The street was named after a mill built in 1833 by Samuel Kingsford. Its name appears for the first time on maps of the Land Department in 1859.

Prior to extensive landfill since the 1950s, the street ended close to the Swan River. As late as 1845 the southern end reached the river. It is now separated from Perth Water by a hotel, the Perth Convention Centre, on and off ramps for the Mitchell Freeway, and Riverside Drive. 

In the 1890s it was the site of a brewery and jetty.

In the 1930s the Australian Broadcasting Commission was considering developing a property to house its Perth base for broadcasting.
  
Mill Street is the main connection for buses leaving the Elizabeth Quay Bus Station, and moving along St Georges Terrace before leaving the CBD.  On the corner of Mill Street and St Georges Terrace, number 181 was known as Hamersley House; it is now known as Parmelia House.

It is the location of the Parmelia Hilton hotel, where a significant number of conferences and events have been reported and published as being conducted in Mill Street.

Intersections

Notes

Streets in Perth central business district, Western Australia